Rees Odhiambo (born September 23, 1992) is a former Kenyan professional American football offensive guard. He played college football at Boise State. He was drafted by the Seattle Seahawks in the third round of the 2016 NFL Draft. Odhiambo also previously played for the Indianapolis Colts, Atlanta Falcons, and Arizona Cardinals.

Early years
Born in Nairobi, Kenya, to parents George and Evelyn Odhiambo, he moved to Texas at the age of seven, shortly after his father's death. Odhiambo's mother died ten years later when he was 17, and he lived with an uncle and rode to school every day with an assistant coach. He has one sibling, a younger sister named Evette.

Odhiambo attended Legacy High School in Mansfield, a suburb southwest of Dallas. He began playing football as a sophomore, after being asked to turn out by an assistant coach who had him in a P.E. class. Odhiambo earned two letters in football (and another in track and field) and graduated in 2011. Boise State was his sole scholarship offer, then led by head coach Chris Petersen.

College career
Odhiambo committed to Boise State prior to his senior year in July 2010 and signed his letter of intent on February 2, 2011. As a true freshman, he redshirted in 2011, and was awarded the Ultimate Goon Award by Tim Socha, BSU's head strength coach. Odhiambo played the next four seasons  for the Broncos and appeared in 32 games. His final two seasons were played under head coach Bryan Harsin, who arrived in 2014.

Professional career

Seattle Seahawks
Odhiambo was drafted by the Seattle Seahawks in the third round of the 2016 NFL Draft, the 97th overall pick. A week later on May 6, he signed a four-year deal worth $2.9 million overall with a $645,416 bonus.  Backed up against their own end-zone during the divisional round of the 2016-17 NFL playoffs, Odhiambo accidentally stepped on the foot of Seahawks quarterback Russell Wilson, causing a safety.

Odhiambo entered the 2017 season as the Seahawks' starting left tackle. He started the first seven games before suffering multiple dislocated fingers in both hands. His injuries required surgery on both hands, and he was placed on injured reserve on November 8, 2017.

On September 2, 2018, Odhiambo was waived by the Seahawks.

Indianapolis Colts
On September 24, 2018, Odhiambo was signed to the Indianapolis Colts' practice squad.

Atlanta Falcons
On October 24, 2018, Odhiambo was signed by the Atlanta Falcons off the Colts' practice squad. He was waived on November 12, 2018.

Indianapolis Colts (second stint)
On November 14, 2018, Odhiambo was signed to the Indianapolis Colts' practice squad.

Arizona Cardinals
On December 3, 2018, Odhiambo was signed by the Arizona Cardinals off the Colts' practice squad.

Odhiambo was waived/injured during final roster cuts on August 31, 2019, and reverted to injured reserve the next day. He was waived from injured reserve with an injury settlement on September 5.

Personal life
Odhiambo graduated from Boise State in December 2015, with a bachelor's degree in exercise science.

On July 31, 2018, Odhiambo became a U.S. citizen after taking his oath at the Tukwila U.S. immigration center.

References

External links
 Seattle Seahawks bio
 Boise State Broncos bio
 
 

1992 births
Living people
American football offensive linemen
Arizona Cardinals players
Atlanta Falcons players
Boise State Broncos football players
Indianapolis Colts players
Kenyan emigrants to the United States
Kenyan players of American football
People from Mansfield, Texas
Seattle Seahawks players
Sportspeople from the Dallas–Fort Worth metroplex
Sportspeople from Nairobi